"Tere Bina" is a 2006 Hindi song from the 2007 Hindi film Guru. It was composed by A. R. Rahman, performed by Rahman, Murtuza Khan, Quadir Khan and Chinmayi and written by Gulzar. It is a love ballad composed in sufi style of music. It is dedicated to the memory of Pakistani qawwali singer Ustad Nusrat Fateh Ali Khan written at the time of the tenth anniversary of his death. The music video was picturised as a dance sequence by Aishwarya Rai and Abhishek Bachchan. The song begins with dham dara dham dara refrains, sung by Murtuza Khan and Quadir Khan.

Reception
The song received favorable critical responses. A review on planetbollywood says, "Tere Bina is arguably Rahman's finest offering in Guru. Murtaza Khan and Qadir Khan's 'dham dara dham dara' refrains are addictive to the core and purely musical bliss! Reverting to a semi-qawwalli landscape in the backgrounds of this subtly beautiful piece, Rahman impresses tremendously with his vocal prowess, which only seems to improve throughout his career. Chinmayee's support is honorable, as she serves as a pleasant foil to Rahman's smooth rendition. Gulzar saab's lyrics are limited, but beautiful nonetheless. Now this is what is expected of a Ratnam-Rahman hook-up!".

The song, along with its entire soundtrack album has proved a success, staying at the number one spot thirteen weeks after its release.

Usage in media
An excerpt of the song is used in 2013 American 3D computer-animated sports comedy film Planes, produced by DisneyToon Studios and released by Walt Disney Pictures.

See also
Guru (soundtrack)

References

2006 songs
Songs with music by A. R. Rahman
Indian songs
Songs written for films
Songs with lyrics by Gulzar